Myet Nhar Myar Tae Kaung Kin is a 2004 Burmese drama film, directed by Maung Myo Min starring Yan Aung, Lwin Moe, Tint Tint Htun and Eaindra Kyaw Zin. Eaindra Kyaw Zin won her first Academy Award in 2004 Myanmar Motion Picture Academy Awards for this film.

Synopsis
Kyaw Swar and Sandy were in love but married U Myat Noe Aung for some reason. Kyaw Swar did not accept Julia's love and said that he only loved Sandy. U Myat Noe Aung knew that Sandy was pregnant with Kyaw Swar, but lied to Sandy. One day, Kyaw Swar told Sandy about it and found out. Kyaw Swar wanted the baby back but could not. Sandy died after giving birth. Only U Myat Noe Aung was allowed to take care of the child.

Cast
Yan Aung as U Myat Noe Aung
Lwin Moe as Kyaw Swar
Tint Tint Htun as Julia
Eaindra Kyaw Zin as Sandy
Phoe Kyaw as Zaw Gyi

Award

References

2004 films
2000s Burmese-language films
Burmese drama films
Films shot in Myanmar
2004 drama films